Zwe Pyae is a prominent contemporary Burmese singer, musician and actor. He rose to fame with his debut album International Heart Broken Day.

Early life and education
Zwe Pyae was born on 30 November 1988 in Mandalay, Burma to Burmese Muslim parents Maung Maung and Khin Htar May, the owner of an agricultural supply shop. Zwe Pyae's Muslim name is Sulaiman. He is the youngest son of 5 children, including 1 elder brother and 4 elder sisters. Zwe Pyae's family is involved in commerce in Pakokku, Magwe Region. He attended Basic Education High School No. 11 Mandalay and is presently pursuing an LLB degree at Yadanabon University.

Career

Music career
Zwe Pyae began his music career in 2011. He launched his debut solo album International Heart Broken Day on 30 November 2014. Since he has released a solo album, he got big break in music industry and performed in many concerts. He released his second solo album Refuge in February 2017 and Refuge video album released on 27 May 2018. His third solo album Arr Koe Par was released on 28 February 2019. He has released 3 solo albums and over 50 collaborative albums in his music career.

Acting career
Zwe made his acting debut with a leading role in the Big-screen movie Do Ghosts Have Horns?, alongside Yamin May Oo and directed by Ei Ei Khine, which premiered in Myanmar cinemas on 6 May 2018. In the same year, he starred a male lead in his second film International Heart Broken Day alongside actress Su Pan Htwar and directed by Myat Khine. The film was converting movie from his song. He then starred a main role in his third film Ma Gyi San and Her Lovers alongside Khin San Win, Su Pan Htwar and Htet Aung Shine, directed by Myat Khine and the film released in 2016.

In 2018, he starred in the Burmese television series Two Flower Jousting where he played the leading role with Paing Phyo Thu and May Barani Thaw which aired on MRTV in March 2018.

Personal life
Zwe married a Pyin U Lwin native, Zali Moe, on 20 July 2019.

Filmography

Film (Big Screen Movies)
Do Ghosts Have Horns? (2016)

Film
International Heart Broken Day (2016)
Ma Gyi San and Her Lovers (2017)

Television series
Two Flower Jousting (2018)

Discography

Solo albums
International Heart Broken Day (2014)
Refuge (2017)
Arr Koe Par (2019)

Collaborative albums

 Over 50 collaborative albums

References 

21st-century Burmese male singers
People from Mandalay Region
1988 births
Living people
Burmese Muslims